Tosontsengel is a sum of Khövsgöl aimag. The area is 2,050 km2, of which 1,800 km2 are pasture and 11 km2 are farmland. In 2000, Tosontsengel had a population of 4,161 people, including some Khotgoid. The sum center, officially named Tsengel, is located 64 km east-southeast of Mörön and 607 km from Ulaanbaatar.

History 

The Tosontsengel sum was founded, together with the whole Khövsgöl aimag, in 1931. In 1933, it had 3,100 inhabitants in 842 households, and about 99,000 heads of livestock. In 1956, the local Ardyn Zorig (people's courage) negdel was founded.

Economy 

In 2004, there were about 137,000 heads of livestock, among them 64,000 goats, 57,000 sheep, 8,800 cattle and yaks, 7,200 horses and 33 camels.

References

Literature 

M. Nyamaa, Khövsgöl aimgiin lavlakh toli, Ulaanbaatar 2001, p. 133

Districts of Khövsgöl Province